Easyriders is an American motorcycle magazine, founded in 1970. It was published monthly by Paisano Publications for over 50 years.

In addition to its coverage of motorcycles (particularly Harley-Davidsons) and related activities, Easyriders is also known for including pictures of nude or topless women and paintings by David Mann who was a California graphic artist whose paintings celebrated biker culture.

The December 1979 issue featured an interview with Willie Nelson, who also appeared on the cover.

The Audit Bureau of Circulation reported that Easyriders had an average paid and verified circulation of 123,587 for the six-month period ending December 31, 2007.

Spin-off
In 1979, Paisano launched a companion publication called Iron Horse, which would continue for many years under various owners.

References

Men's magazines published in the United States
Monthly magazines published in the United States
Motorcycle magazines published in the United States
Quarterly magazines published in the United States
Magazines established in 1970
Magazines published in California